Rear admiral Anthony John Cooke  (21 September 1927 – 1 December 2019) was a Royal Navy officer who became President of the Royal Naval College, Greenwich.

Naval career
Educated at the St Edward's School, Oxford, Cooke joined the Royal Navy in 1945. He became Commodore in command of HMNB Clyde in 1973, Senior Naval Member on the staff of the Royal College of Defence Studies in 1975 and President of the Royal Naval College, Greenwich in 1978 before retiring in 1980.

He was promoted to the substantive rank of rear admiral on 7 January 1976, having previously held acting rank.

In retirement he became Private Secretary to the Lord Mayor of London.

He died on 1 December 2019 at the age of 92.

References

1927 births
2019 deaths
Royal Navy rear admirals
Companions of the Order of the Bath
Admiral presidents of the Royal Naval College, Greenwich